The Bulletin of the History of Medicine is a quarterly peer-reviewed academic journal established in 1933. It is an official publication of the American Association for the History of Medicine and of the Johns Hopkins Institute of the History of Medicine. The journal covers social, emotional, cultural, and scientific aspects of the history of medicine and includes critical reviews of recent literature in the field.

External links 
 
 Johns Hopkins University – Institute of the History of Medicine

History of medicine journals
Publications established in 1939
Johns Hopkins University Press academic journals
English-language journals
Quarterly journals